This is a list of ski areas and resorts in South Korea. The list includes closed ski areas and resorts which are maintaining its facilities. Dismantled ski areas and resorts are not listed.

Gangwon-do 

 Alpensia
 Alps Resort – closed but facilities are maintained
 Elysian Gangchon
 High1
 Jeongseon Alpine Centre – closed but facilities are maintained
 Oak Valley
 O2 Resort
 Phoenix Pyeongchang
 Vivaldi Park
 Welli Hilli Park
 Yongpyong Resort

Gyeonggi-do 
 Bears Town
 Jisan Forest Resort
 Konjiam Resort
 Star Hill Resort – closed but facilities are maintained
 Yangji Pine Resort

Other regions

Jeollabuk-do 
 Muju Resort

Gyeongsangnam-do 
 Eden Valley Resort

See also 
 List of ski areas and resorts
 List of ski areas and resorts in Japan

References

External links 
 Ski Resort Business Association of Korea – 회원사 소개 

South Korea
Ski areas and resorts in South Korea